Catherine Grubb (born 1945) is a British artist.

Biography

Grubb was born in Bellshill in Lanarkshire; her parents were Scottish and Lithuanian. She lived in London as a child. Grubb studied at Edinburgh College of Art and the University of Edinburgh. She researched mediaeval artists' sketchbooks.

She works in both printmaking (etching) and painting.

She has also taught at schools and at Harrow School of Art.

Grubb has had links to Cornwall since 1982, and now lives in Truro. She has designed costumes for The Questors Theatre.

Her work is held in the Government Art Collection and in the art collection of the University of Stirling.

Exhibitions

Exhibitions of her work have included:

 Ealing Professional Painters' Exhibition, 1972
 Exhibition at the Bull's Eye, Birmingham, 1974
 Bluecoat Gallery, Liverpool, 1976
 New Etchings by Catherine Grubb, at Questors' Theatre, 1985
 Etchings, at Uxbridge Central Library, 1989
 New Richmond Gallery, 1990

References

External links
 Papers at the Newlyn Archive
 Catherine Grubb's work Eleanor Rigby discussed in exhibition From Walls to Windows, 2020
 Works in collection of University of Edinburgh

1945 births
Living people
20th-century Scottish women artists
20th-century Scottish painters
20th-century British printmakers
21st-century Scottish women artists
21st-century Scottish painters
21st-century British printmakers
Alumni of the Edinburgh College of Art
Alumni of the University of Edinburgh
People from Bellshill
People from Truro
Scottish women painters